Mahaveer Prasad (11 November 1939 – 28 November 2010) was an Indian politician. He stood for the 2004 Lok Sabha elections on the Indian National Congress ticket and until his death was a Member of Parliament for Bansgaon. He was the Union Cabinet Minister of Small Scale Industries and Agro and Rural Industries.

Prasad was a member of the Uttar Pradesh Legislative Assembly from 1974 to 1977. He was elected to the 7th Lok Sabha in 1980 and to the 8th Lok Sabha in 1984. He was Union Deputy Minister of Railways from February 1988 to July 1989 and Minister of State for Mines and Steel in the Department of Mines from July 1989 to December 1989. He was elected to the 9th Lok Sabha in 1989 and served as Governor of Haryana from 14 June 1994 to 1999. While he was Governor of Haryana, he also served as Governor of Himachal Pradesh from 18 September 1995 to 16 November 1995 and again from 23 April 1996 to 26 July 1997. He was elected to the 14th Lok Sabha in 2004, and following the election he became Union Cabinet Minister of Small Scale Industries and Agro & Rural Industries on 22 May 2004.

Mahaveer Prasad died on 28 November 2010 at the Sir Ganga Ram Hospital in Delhi after a long illness.

References

1939 births
2010 deaths
Indian National Congress politicians
People from Gorakhpur
India MPs 2004–2009
Members of the Cabinet of India
Lok Sabha members from Uttar Pradesh
Governors of Haryana
Governors of Himachal Pradesh
India MPs 1980–1984
India MPs 1984–1989
India MPs 1989–1991
People from Gorakhpur district